Thomas Burton Bottomore  (8 April 1920, England – 9 December 1992, Sussex, England) was a British Marxist sociologist.

Bottomore was Secretary of the International Sociological Association from 1953 to 1959. He was the eighth president of ISA (1974-1978).

He was a prolific editor and translator of Marxist works, notably his collections published in 1963: Marx's Early Writings and Selected Writings in Sociology and Social Philosophy. 

He was Reader in Sociology at the London School of Economics from 1952 to 1964. He was head of the Department of Political Science, Sociology and Anthropology at Simon Fraser University, Vancouver from 1965 to 1967, leaving after a dispute over academic freedom. He was Professor of Sociology at the University of Sussex from 1968 to 1985.

Bottomore edited and contributed to numerous journals of sociology and political science, and edited A Dictionary of Marxist Thought in 1983 and co-edited (with William Outhwaite) The Blackwell Dictionary of Twentieth century Social Thought published posthumously in 1993.

Bottomore was a member of the British Labour Party.

Works

Classes in Modern Society (London: Ampersand, 1955; London: George Allen & Unwin, 1965) 
Marx: Selected Writings in Sociology & Social Philosophy (London: Watts, 1956; Harmondsworth: Penguin, 1963)  editor with Maximilien Rubel 
Sociology: A Guide to Problems & Literature (London: George Allen & Unwin, 1962) 
Early Writings of Karl Marx (London: Watts, 1963) editor and translator 
Elites and Society (London: Watts, 1964; Harmondsworth: Penguin, 1966; Harmondsworth: Penguin. 1967; New York: Penguin, 1970; London:  Routledge, 1993) 
Critics of Society: Radical Thought in North America (London: George Allen & Unwin, 1967) 
Karl Marx (Oxford : Basil Blackwell, 1956) 
Karl Marx (Englewood Cliffs, N.J.: Prentice-Hall, 1973) editor 
Sociology as Social Criticism (London: Allen & Unwin, 1975) ISBN 0-04-301068-7 : £4.25, 0-04-301069-5 (Pbk) : £2.10
Marxist Sociology (London: Macmillan, 1975) ISBN 0-333-18754-7 : £2.95, 0-333-13774-4 (pbk) : £1.25
A History of Sociological Analysis editor with Robert Nisbet (New York: Basic Books, 1979) ISBN 0-465-03023-8 : $29.50, 0-465-03024-6 (pbk)
Modern Interpretations of Marx (1981) editor, 
Georg Simmel - The Philosophy of Money (1982, 2004, 2011)) translator with David Frisby ISBN 978-0-415-61011-7
A Dictionary of Marxist Thought editor (Oxford: Blackwell, 1983) ISBN 0-631-12852-2 
Sociology and Socialism (Brighton: Wheatsheaf, 1984) ISBN 0-7108-0230-7 : £15.95, 0-7108-0235-8 (pbk) : £ 4.95
Theories of Modern Capitalism (London: Allen & Unwin, 1985) ISBN 0-04-301186-1 (pbk.)
Interpretations of Marx editor (Oxford: Blackwell, 1988) ISBN 0-631-15256-3
The Capitalist Class: An International Study with Robert J. Brym (New York : Harvester Wheatsheaf, 1989) ISBN 0-7450-0296-X
The Socialist Economy-Theory and Practice (New York: Harvester Wheatsheaf, 1990) ISBN 0-7450-0118-1, 0-7450-0119-X (pbk)
Between Marginalism and Marxism: The Economic Sociology of J A Schumpeter (New York: St Martin's Press, 1992) ISBN 0-312-09105-2
The Frankfurt School (London: Tavistock, 1984, 1995) ISBN 0-85312-458-2 (Libr. ed.), 0-85312-468-X (Stud. ed.)

References

Further reading

 Outhwaite, William and Michael Mulkay (eds.). 1987. Social Theory and Social Criticism: Essays for Tom Bottomore. Oxford, UK: B. Blackwell,

External links
Translated Penguin Book at  Penguin First Editions
Short biographical note at Marxists.org
Catalogue of the Bottomore papers at the Archives Division of the London School of Economics.

1920 births
1992 deaths
Academics of the London School of Economics
Academics of the University of Sussex
English sociologists
Marxist theorists
Presidents of the British Sociological Association
Academic staff of Simon Fraser University
Presidents of the International Sociological Association